Things named after the astronomy and relativity scientist Karl Schwarzschild (1873–1916) include:
 Institutions:
 Karl Schwarzschild Medal
 Karl Schwarzschild Observatory
 Astronomical features:
 Lunar crater Schwarzschild
 Asteroid 837 Schwarzschilda 
 Technical terms:
Schwarzschild constant
 Schwarzschild effect in photography, also known as reciprocity failure, and important for calibrating astronomical measurement
Schwarzschild law, empirical equation relating to Schwarzschild effect
 Schwarzschild criterion, in astronomy
 Schwarzschild coordinates
 Schwarzschild's equation for radiative transfer
 Relativity terms:
 Schwarzschild metric (closely related to Schwarzschild solution, Schwarzschild geometry, Schwarzschild black hole, and Schwarzschild vacuum)
de Sitter–Schwarzschild metric
Distorted Schwarzschild metric
Schwarzschild geodesics
 Schwarzschild fluid solution
 Schwarzschild kugelblitz
 Schwarzschild radius (closely related to Schwarzschild horizon)
 Schwarzschild wormholes
 Schwarzschild telescope

Schwarzschild